Love Lifting is a 2012 Hong Kong romantic drama film written and directed by Herman Yau and starring Chapman To and Elanne Kong.

Plot
After experiencing failures in a relationship and business, bar owner Shek Yung (Chapman To) moves to the suburbs of Shek O, where he is mistaken by others as a distressed triad leader. While feeling frustrated and lonely, Yung meets his neighbor Lee Lai (Elanne Kong), a former weightlifter who was forced to retire due to diabetes. Later, the two of them marry and have son. However, Lai cannot let go of her beloved weightlifting career and Yung helps and encourages his wife to repelt back into weight training and fulfil her uncompleted dream. In this way, Yung serves the role as a house husband to support his wife to return to the weightlifting arena.

Cast
Chapman To as Shek Yung
Elanne Kong as Lee Lai
Tien Niu as Pretty Hung
Jeremy Tsui as Kin
Feng Haoxu as Shek Lui
Zhang Songwen as Coach Chan Chiu
Huang Jianxin as Coach Qiu
Jun Kung as Brother Ding
Bob Lam as Furniture mover
Terence Siufay as Furniture mover
Vincent Chui as Doctor
Joe Cheung as Yung's father
Lee Fung as Yung's mother
Tam Kon-chung as Condo's security guard

Theme song
You Give Me Strength (你給我力量)
Composer: Alan Cheung
Lyricist: Lee Man
Singer: Elanne Kong

Reception

Critical
James Mrash of Twitch Film gave the film a negative review and writes "While Love Lifting has plenty of potential, as a sweet natured romance, domestic drama, or competitive sports movie, the script never feels committed to developing its story in any particular direction. A number of subplots are introduced - Yung's financial struggles and money-hungry ex-wife (whom we never see), a rivalry between Li Li's former and current coaches, Li Li's diabetes itself - only to be forgotten about or easily resolved without any drama or difficulty. Instead, the story simply progresses from A to B to C without any sense of urgency, peril, anticipation or excitement." LoveHKFilm gave the film a relatively positive review and writes "Seemingly outrageous premise is played straight to positive, low-key effect. Director Herman Yau never oversells Love Lifting, making it enjoyable and probably a little too light. A likable if inessential film. Elanne Kong is surprisingly effective in the lead role."

Box office
The film grossed US$165,589 at the Hong Kong box office.

Awards and nominations
32nd Hong Kong Film Awards
Nominated: Best Actress (Elanne Kong)
19th Hong Kong Film Critics Society Award
Won: Film of Merit

References

External links

Love Lifting at Hong Kong Cinemagic

2012 films
2012 romantic drama films
Hong Kong romantic drama films
2010s sports films
Sports fiction
2010s Cantonese-language films
Films directed by Herman Yau
Films set in Hong Kong
Films shot in Hong Kong
2010s Hong Kong films